Masterpeace is the sixth studio album by American heavy metal band Metal Church released on July 22, 1999 via Nuclear Blast. It features the return of vocalist David Wayne, absent since The Dark (1986), being the band's final studio album to feature him before his death in May 2005. All original members recorded on Masterpeace except guitarist Craig Wells and drummer Kirk Arrington. Jeff Wade (the "friendly ghost") filled in for Arrington on the album and on tour. This was the second Metal Church album to feature the cruciform Gibson Explorer on a cover, the first being the band's 1984 debut.

Album information 
Kurt Vanderhoof criticized the failed reunion for the album, Masterpeace', which I like to call 'Disasterpeace'. The whole thing was a great idea, but when we tried to put together, it just didn't work. We got forced into doing some stuff, and, I swear, when we played Wacken with David Wayne, the whole thing fell apart with having all the original members. They literally forced us into doing that, and I was telling the management and record company, 'Look, this is a bad, bad idea.' We played, and we sucked — I mean, it was horrible. I was, like, 'Fuck you. I told you, and I warned you that this is bad.'" When asked about the reunion, he explains, "Well, David Wayne couldn't sing anymore — he was fucked up on drugs; prescription drugs, because that's 'different.' It was fun to play with John Marshall, but Kirk couldn't do it because of his health, and that's when I had to cut ties with Kirk. He didn't play, and he barely played on the record, and it took forever to get that done. It just didn't work. It was a horrible feeling. We did a tour and it was awful. We're still recovering from that now." He then adds, "Literally, 'Masterpeace', that era was when I decided I am never, never doing that again."

Track listing 
All tracks written by Kurdt Vanderhoof and David Wayne, except where noted

Personnel
Metal Church
David Wayne – vocals
John Marshall – lead guitar
Kurdt Vanderhoof – rhythm guitar, mellotron, producer, engineer, mixing
Duke Erickson – bass
Kirk Arrington – drums

Additional musicians
Jeff Wade – drums

Production
Mark Greer – producer, engineer, mixing
Karl Welty – engineer

References

1999 albums
Metal Church albums
Nuclear Blast albums
SPV/Steamhammer albums